Honghuagang District is a district of the city of Zunyi, Guizhou province, China. It is under the administration of Zunyi city. Its population as of 2002 was 470,000.

External links

County-level divisions of Guizhou
Zunyi